Following is a list of private railway stations, stations which at some time have been private halts.  It details the name of the railway station, its location, dates (where known), reason for its existence and any additional information.

See also
 List of private railway stations in Great Britain

References

 List
Private